Jianming Qian from the University of Michigan, was awarded the status of Fellow in the American Physical Society, after he was nominated by their Division of Particles and Fields in 2009, for outstanding contributions and leadership in the analysis of high-energy particle interactions at CERN and at Fermilab, with especially noteworthy participation in the D-Zero experiment leading to the recent discovery of two new baryons containing b-qu.

References 

Fellows of the American Physical Society
American Physical Society
American physicists
Living people
Date of death missing
Year of birth missing (living people)